Trevor Stewart (born May 20, 1997) is an American Olympic athlete. He won a bronze medal in the Mixed 4 x 400 metres relay at the 2020 Summer Games.

A student at North Carolina A&T State University, where he is coached by Duane Ross, Stewart finished second at the 2019 NCAA 400m race in Austin, Texas behind Kahmari Montgomery from the University of Houston, Stewart ran a personal best time of 44.25. It was the 7th fastest man by a man that year in the 400 metres.

At the 2021 NCAA 400m at Hayward Field at the University of Oregon in Eugene, he ran a 44.96, placing fourth behind Noah Williams, Bryce Deadmon and Randolph Ross.

On June 19, 2021, he qualified for the final of the US Olympic Trials 400m race, running the fastest time of 44:75 in the heats, and fifth fastest in the semifinal. In the final he finished fourth in 44.90 to qualify for the relay pool at the 2020 Summer Games in Tokyo. He ran in the final of the Mixed 4x400 metres relay, winning a bronze medal.

Personal life
Stewart has been an asthmatic since childhood.

References

External links
 North Carolina A&T Aggies bio
 

1997 births
Living people
African-American track and field athletes
American male sprinters
Athletes (track and field) at the 2020 Summer Olympics
Medalists at the 2020 Summer Olympics
North Carolina A&T Aggies men's track and field athletes
Olympic bronze medalists for the United States in track and field
Olympic gold medalists for the United States in track and field
People from Lorton, Virginia
Track and field athletes from Virginia
21st-century African-American sportspeople